Vinicunca, or Winikunka, also called Montaña de Siete Colores (literally: Mountain of seven colors), Montaña de Colores (Mountain of colors) or Montaña Arcoíris (Rainbow Mountain), is a mountain in the Andes of Peru with an altitude of  above sea level. It is located on the road to the Ausangate mountain, in the Cusco region, between Cusipata District, province of Quispicanchi, and Pitumarca District, province of Canchis.

As of 2019, no robust methods of transportation to Vinicunca have been developed to accommodate travelers, as it requires passage through a valley.

In mid-2010, mass tourism came, attracted by the mountain's series of stripes of various colors due to its mineralogical composition on the slopes and summits. The mountain used to be covered by glacier caps, but these had melted due to climate change .

Location 

Vinicunca is located to the southeast of the city of Cusco and can be reached from Cusco via two routes: Cusipata or Pitumarca. One route is through the Peruvian Sierra del Sur (PE-3s) in the direction of the town of Checacupe, and further to the town of Pitumarca, which is around two hours from the city of Cusco. From Pitumarca, travelers may go by foot, car or motorbike along a trail passing through several rural communities such as Ocefina, Japura and Hanchipacha, and reach the community of Pampa Chiri, where a 1.5-kilometer walk along the Vinincunca pass leads to the natural formation with stripes of colors that give the name Rainbow Mountain. An alternative route is via Cusipata; from there, travellers may walk for 3 km along the Chillihuani route along a bridle path to the Rainbow Mountain.

The altitude of the mountain is around 5200 meters or over 17,000 feet, so time for acclimatizing to the high altitude may be necessary during the trek up to the summit.

Weather 
Travelers to Peru and locals generally agree that the best time of the year to visit the colorful site is in August, since it is dry season and provides a very beautiful view, maximizing the vivid colors of the mountains. Nevertheless, the famous colors always look beautiful.

Travelers are advised to try to avoid days following significant rainfall (in December, January and February), more so after snow has fallen. As to fauna, travelers may see a wide variety of alpacas and other camelids in certain short seasons.

Mineralogical composition 
According to the Cultural Landscape Office of the Decentralization of the City of Cusco, the seven colors of the mountain are due to its mineralogical composition: the pink color is due to red clay, fangolitas (mud) and arilitas (sand); the whitish colouring is due to quartzose, sandstone and marls, rich in calcium carbonate; the red is due to claystones (iron) and clays belonging to the Upper Tertiary period; the green is due to phyllites and clays rich in ferro magnesian; the earthy brown is a product of fanglomerate composed of rock with magnesium belonging to the Quaternary period; and the mustard yellow color comes from the calcareous sandstones rich in sulphurous minerals.

Mountain concession for mining 
An approval process for mining began on March 30, 2015, in Lima, when the mining exploration company Minquest Perú SAC, owned by the Canadian Camino Minerals Corporation, submitted a petition to mine Red Beds to the Geological, Mining and Metallurgical Institute (Instituto Geológico Minero y Metalúrgico, INGEMMET). The petition included the territory of the districts of Cusipata and Pitumarca with an area of 400 hectares, covering the whole of the mountain, and overlapping the peasant communities of Chillihuani and Pampachiri. INGEMMET issued a warning that parts of this territory, including Vinicunca, should have been protected within the "Ausangate Regional Conservation Area". In 2009, the Regional Government of Cusco had proposed the creation of this protected area to Peru's National Service of Protected Natural Areas (Servicio Nacional de Áreas Naturales Protegidas, SERNANP). However, SERNANP responded that the Ausangate Regional Conservation Area had never been officially created, since the proposal had not met the necessary requirements. Therefore, on March 16, 2018, with Presidential Resolution No. 042-2018-INGEMMET / PCD / PM INGEMMET, the title of metallic mining concession was granted.

On May 21, 2018, following public protests, the company informed the Regional Government of Cusco of its renunciation of the concession; however, the Regional Government indicated that it was the Ministry of Energy and Mines that must assume the administrative actions to recover possession of these lands. The National Chamber of Tourism (CANATUR) expressed its deep concern over the management of Vinicunca, one of the most important components of Peru's new appeal to tourism.

In November 2018, Peru's President Martín Vizcarra issued a decree enforcing a 12-month moratorium on all mining activity in the area. The Regional Government stated its expectation that within that time frame, the Ministry of Energy and Mines would permanently register the region as a protected conservation area.

In 2019, as a result of joint work between the Ministry of the Environment and the National Service of Natural Protected Areas (Sernanp), Ausangate was finally established as one of three new Regional Conservation Areas. Government representatives made the announcement during the COP25 event in Madrid. According to Cusco's manager for natural resources, the measure to protect the area does not guarantee that mining projects hoping to extract lithium will be banned. However, Cusco's governor, Jean Paul Benavente, said that permits for these projects should be declined in order to comply with the measure.

Gallery

See also
 Apu (god)
 Ausangate
 Mineral industry of Peru
 Tourism in Peru

References

Montaña de colores Cusco Ver

External links

Geology of the colors

Mountains of Cusco Region
Mountains of Peru
Tourist attractions in Cusco Region
Five-thousanders of the Andes
Geology of Peru